James Angus (born 1970) is an Australian artist known for 'his engaging and rigorously crafted sculptures'.

Biography
James Angus was born in Perth, Western Australia in 1970. Angus holds a degree in Fine Arts from Curtin University of Technology and a Master of Fine Arts (Sculpture) from Yale University School of Art. He has also lectured at UTS.

Selected grants and awards
Angus has been honoured with a number of prestigious awards across his career. These include Fulbright Postgraduate Award, 1996; Yale University Travelling Fellowship, 1998; Australia Council Professional Development Grant, 1998 and 2001; Studio residency, Cite des Arts, Paris, 2003; Short listed for National Sculpture Prize, National Gallery of Australia, 2005; Basil Sellers Art Prize, Melbourne; 2008 and Australia Council Fellowship, 2009.

Exhibitions
He has exhibited widely at institutions such as the Museum of Contemporary Art, Sydney; Art Gallery of Western Australia, Perth; Art Gallery of South Australia, Adelaide; Perth Institute of Contemporary Arts, Perth; Museum of Contemporary Art, Chicago; Monash University Art Gallery, Melbourne; National Gallery of Victoria, Melbourne; Nationalgalerie im Hamburger Bahnhof, Berlin; Art Gallery of New South Wales, Sydney; National Gallery of Australia, Canberra; Musee d'Art Contemporain, Lyon, France; and Heide Museum of Modern Art, Melbourne.

Public collections
Angus' works are included in numerous public and private collections. These include:
 Museum of Contemporary Art, Chicago
 National Gallery of Australia, Canberra
 Museum of Contemporary Art, Sydney
 Art Gallery of Western Australia, Perth
 Art Gallery of South Australia, Adelaide
 Museum of Old and New Art, Hobart
 Monash University Gallery, Monash
 Austcorp, Sydney
 Murdoch University Art Collection, Perth
 Auckland Art Gallery, Auckland
 Newcastle Regional Art Gallery, Newcastle

Public commissions
Angus' prominent public commissions have included;

 Day in Day Out, 1 Bligh Street, Sydney, 2011
 Grow Your Own, Forrest Place, Perth, 2010 (The single largest art commission ever undertaken in Western Australia)
 Lycee Ferdinand Buisson, Voiron, France, 2009
 Geo Face Distributor, National Portrait Gallery, Canberra, 2009
 Ellipsoidal Freeway Sculpture, Eastlink Freeway, Connect East, Melbourne, 2008
 Wave Machine, Sydney Theatre Company, Sydney, 2005
 Public Art Fund, New York, 1999

References

External links
JamesAngus.net

Further reading

 Elizabeth Ann Macgregor, "James Angus", (Sydney: Museum of Contemporary Art, 2006)
 www.theage.com.au/entertainment/art-and-design/a-revolt-in-art-20110114-19rdf.html
James Angus at Roslyn Oxley 9
James Angus at Gavin Brown's enterprise
James Angus at Triple V
 'Gallery's new work has many faces', Border Mail, 27 October 2009, p. 9
 Pryor, Sally, 'Not just another face in the crowd', Canberra Times, 27 October 2010, p. 1
 Katrina Strickland, 'Mid-City Statement- The evolution of a major new sculpture,' The Australian Financial Review, Thursday 29, July, pp. 44
 Andrew Taylor, 'Tractor as art', The Sun Herald, 17 October 2010, pp 36
 Bolland, Michaela, 'Orange blob replaces white man on horse', The Australian, 27 October 2009, p. 6
 Chapman, Christopher, 'Abstraction and figuration', Portrait34, Summer ed, 2009
 Strickland, Katrina, 'Mid city statement: the evolution of a major new sculpture’, Financial Review, 29 July 2009, p. 44
 'James Angus', To make a work of timeless art-MCA Primavera Acquisitions, 08-09
 Art and Australia, Current, Contemporary Art from Australia and New Zealand, 2008, p44
 Christov-Bakargiev, Carolyn. (ed.) 2008 Biennale of Sydney: Revolutions – Forms That Turn, exh.cat. Thames & Hudson: Australia, 2008
 Scarlett, Ken, ‘No stopping on the freeway!’, Australian Art Review, August–October 2008, pp. 34–36
 Bevan, Robert ‘art & events’, Vogue Living Australia, January/February 2007, pp. 69 – 72
 Palmer, Daniel, ‘Looking Back: Retrospectives’, Frieze, mo. 104, December – January 2007, p. 128, p. 130
 Angus, James, James Angus, Art and Australia, 2006 (published to accompany the exhibition of James Angus curated by Rachel Kent at the Museum of Contemporary Art)
 Broadsheet interview with Linda Michael for 2006 Adelaide Biennial, Broadsheet, Vol. 35 No. 1, March – May 2006 pp. 24 – 27
 Boyd, Chris ‘Both literal and figurative’, The Weekend Australian Financial Review, 2 – 3 September 2006, pp. 32 – 33
 Clement, T. ‘Collision Theory’, in the Metro, The Sydney Morning Herald, 13–19 January 2006 p. 19
 Cook, Robert, ‘James Angus’, 21st Century Modern, 2006 Adelaide Biennial of Australian Art catalogue, curated by Linda Michael, published by Art Gallery of South Australia, Adelaide, 2006 pp. 18–19
 Fortescue, Elizabeth ‘Off the Wall – James Angus at the Museum of Contemporary Art’, Daily Telegraph, 18 September 2006, p. 63
 Jinman, Richard, ‘It’s a shift to the right for this old racer’, The Sydney Morning Herald, Wednesday, 13 September 2006, p. 13
 Smee, Sebastian, "Watch out for sharp bends", The Australian, Monday 25 September 2006
 Charles Robb and Wes Hill, ‘James Angus, Museum of Contemporary Art, Sydney,’ Eyeline, number 64, pp56–57
 "James Angus," National Sculpture Prize and Exhibition (exh. cat.), National Gallery of Australia, Canberra, 2005, p. 13
 Duncan, Jenepher, "James Angus," Wall Power (exh. cat.), Art Gallery of Western Australia, Perth, Australia, 2005 (unpaginated)
 Engberg, Juliana, ‘The Body in the Box: Callum Morton and James Angus’, Art and Australia, Vol. 42, No. 4, 2005, pp. 580 – 587
 Gallerie d’Art & Co, "A Bocca Aperte: In Australia ‘’arte riesce a togliere il fiato," 2005
 Israel, Glenis artwise contemporary: visual arts 10–12, John Wiley & Sons, Qld. 2005 pp. 7 – 13
 Margaret Marsh, Michele Watts and Craig Malyon A.R.T. 2 practice, Oxford University Press, Melbourne 2005 p. 212-23
 MCA Collection: New Acquisitions in Context, exhibition catalogue, Sydney 2005 p 6, 24
 Sydney Morning Herald, "Stories Revisited: The semiotics of installation," (refers to Lenny Ann Low, 6 August 2004), ed. Matt Buchanan, 7 January 2005, p. 26 (Summer Spectrum)
 ArtLife, "It’s a Truck!", Monday, 30 August 2004
 Crone, Bridget, "Face Up: Contemporary Australian Art in Berlin," Art & Australia, vol. 41, no. 3, Autumn 2004, p. 386, 387
 Grayson, Richard, "The Downside up Show," Broadsheet, vol. 32, no. 4, 2/2003 – 12/2004
 Higson, Rosalie, "Truckload of meanings squeezed for a tease," The Australian, 6 August 2004
 Hill, Peter, "Keep on Truckin’," Sydney Morning Herald (Spectrum), 14 – 15 August 2004, p. 8 – 9
 Hill, Peter, "Join the Red Dots," Spectrum, 25–26 Sept 2004, p. 8
 Holubizky, Ihor, Truck Corridor, exhibition catalogue, Art Gallery of New South Wales Contemporary Projects, Art Gallery of New South Wales, Sydney, 2004
 Low, Lenny Ann, "Sculptor becomes truckie in the name of art," Sydney Morning Herald, 6 August 2004
 Wahjudi, Claudia, "Face up – Xeitgenösshiche Kunst aus Australien," Austellungen, Kunstforum International, Bd. 168, 1 February 2004
 Angus, James, "On making Manta Ray," Face Up: Contemporary Art from Australia, exhibition catalogue, Museum for the Present, Nationalgalerie im Hamburger Bahnhof, Berlin, 2003, p. 59
 Carsten Probst, "Face Up – Zeitgenössiche australische Kunst im Hamburger Bahnhof Berlin," DeutschlandFunk – ‘Kultur heute’, 2 October 2003
 Angus, James, "Manta Ray: In search of perfect ambiguity," Art & Australia, 40th Anniversary Issue, Winter, vol. 40, no. 4, 2003, p. 580, 581
 Apthorp, Shirley, "Urban work smashes cliches: Berlin is set to experience the cutting edge of Australian art," The Australian, Tuesday, 30 September 2003, p. 15
 B.R. "Berlin: Opération séduction, L’oeil, Dezember 2003
 Berlino, A, "Face Up. L’arte australiana va forte," Arte, December 2003
 Boriani, Glenda "artsaustralia berlin 03," tema celeste, (1), No.100, November/December 2003
 Dick, T, "Right wavelength keeps career going upwards," Sydney Morning Herald (Metropolitan), Friday, 8 August 2003, p. 12
 Duncan, Jenepher and Linda Michael, Monash University and Monash University Museum of Art, Victoria, 2003, p. 45 – 51
 Grayson, Richard, "James Angus," Face Up: Contemporary Art from Australia, exhibition catalogue, Museum for the Present, Nationalgalerie im Hamburger Bahnhof, Berlin, 2003, p. 60, 61
 Green, Stephanie, "Review: Gulliver’s Travels, Perth Institute of Contemporary Arts," Object, no. 43, 2003, p. 89
 Meagher, Caroline, "Bridging the Gap," State of the Arts, October – December 2003
 Rees, Simon, "Still Life: Art Gallery of New South Wales, Sydney," Flash Art, vol. 36 no. 233, November –December 2003, p. 51
 "Face Up: Contemporary Australian Art," review, Flash Art, October 2003, vol. 36, no. 232, p. 46
 Shineberg, Susan, "Triumph in the teeth of adversity," The Sydney Morning Herald, 6 October 2003
 Shineberg, Susan, "In the jaws of Berlin’s Great Whites, a taste of Australia," The Age, Saturday, 4 October 2003, p. 9 (News)
 Von Thomas Joerdens, "Poppig und gefährlich" Oranienburger Generalanzeiger, 7 October 2003
 "Face up – Zeitgenössische Kunst aus Australien"
 McKenzie, Dr. Janet, "FACE UP," Studio International, UK, 4 December 2003
 Palmer, D. "A Surrealist Party Tape", Critical Interventions – Biennale of Sydney 2002, Artspace Visual Arts Centre, Sydney
 Hynes, V and Pryor L. "James Angus – 2002 Biennale of Sydney" Sydney Morning Herald feature, May 2002
 Delaney, Max, "Skeletons in the closet: from the monument to the model – sculpture   in the Collection," Monash University

21st-century Australian sculptors
Living people
1970 births
Artists from Perth, Western Australia
Curtin University alumni